Reach for the Sky is an album by Sutherland Brothers and Quiver. It was released in 1975 on Columbia/CBS Records, and produced by Howard and Ron Albert. The album reached No. 26 on the UK Albums Chart in 1976. It contains the UK No. 5 and Ireland and Netherlands No. 1 hit single, "Arms of Mary".

Track listing

Personnel
Iain Sutherland - rhythm guitar, vocals
Gavin Sutherland - bass guitar, vocals; double bass on "Reach for the Sky"
Tim Renwick - lead guitar
Willie Wilson - drums; cardboard boxes on "Reach for the Sky"
with:
D. J. Gilmour - pedal steel guitar on "Ain't Too Proud"
Howard Albert - organ on "Dr. Dancer"
Mike Lewis - string arrangement and conductor on "Moonlight Lady"
Technical
Mike Ross-Trevor - engineer
Alex Sadkin - mastering
Rosław Szaybo - design, illustration

Charts

References

1975 albums
The Sutherland Brothers albums
Quiver (band) albums
Columbia Records albums
CBS Records albums
Albums produced by the Albert Brothers
albums recorded at Morgan Sound Studios